96.7 Good Vibes Radio (DWWV 96.7 MHz) is an FM station owned by Allied Broadcasting Center and operated by Tune8 Media Production. Its studios and transmitter are located at Rhynux Bldg., Brgy. San Miguel, Iriga.

References

External links
Good Vibes Radio FB Page

Radio stations established in 2012
Radio stations in Camarines Sur